{{DISPLAYTITLE:C9H10N2}}
The molecular formula C9H10N2 (molar mass: 146.19 g/mol, exact mass: 146.0844 u) may refer to:

 Dimethylbenzimidazole, or 5,6-Dimethylbenzimidazole
 Myosmine

Molecular formulas